Glipa tripartita is a species of beetle in the genus Glipa. It was described in 1934.

References

tripartita
Beetles described in 1934